Burden of Dreams is a 1982 "making-of" documentary film directed by Les Blank, shot during and about the chaotic production of Werner Herzog's 1982 film Fitzcarraldo, and filmed on location in the jungles of Peru.

Plot summary

Cast
 Werner Herzog as Self
 Klaus Kinski as Fitzcarraldo / Self
 Claudia Cardinale as Molly / Self
 Jason Robards as Fitzcarraldo
 Mick Jagger as Wilbur

Production
Throughout production, director Les Blank and his small crew became exhausted and exasperated from the stress of the work. Blank said that he felt "unconnected to the people around me". Keeping up with the antics of Herzog and Klaus Kinski (the film's star) proved difficult for the reserved, introverted Blank. By the last week of production, he was so burnt out that he feared coming out of production "like some Viet Nam veterans, horribly calloused". He wrote in his journal, "I'm tired of it all and I couldn't care less if they move the stupid ship – or finish the fucking film".

Blank would often ask Herzog to repeat statements while being filmed that he originally made off-camera. In a 2009 interview with Jesse Pearson for Vice magazine, Blank was asked to recall a scene in the documentary showing Herzog delivering a monologue about the violence and destruction of the jungle around him. Blank says that the scene originally took place in the middle of a canoe ride, away from cameras, but he liked the speech enough to coax it out of Herzog again. "When the moment was right," Blank told Vice, "I pulled him aside and said, 'Can I do a little interview?' And he said, 'Sure.'" A friend of Blank's "led [Herzog] around to something that sparked him off on that tangent again. That's how we got the speech."

Reception
On Rotten Tomatoes it has an approval rating of 94% based on reviews from 17 critics.
 
Roger Ebert awarded the film a full four stars, writing that "Blank [...] is unafraid to ask difficult questions and portray Herzog, warts and all".

The film received the 1983 British Academy Film Award for Best Documentary and was named Best of Festival at the San Francisco Film Festival the same year.

The film poster was created by Montana artist Monte Dolack.

Preservation
The Academy Film Archive preserved Burden of Dreams in 1999.

See also
Other documentaries about troubled movie productions:
 Hearts of Darkness: A Filmmaker's Apocalypse, about the making of Apocalypse Now
 Lost Soul, about the making of the 1996 version of The Island of Dr. Moreau
 Lost in La Mancha, about the failed attempt to make The Man Who Killed Don Quixote
 Jodorowsky's Dune, about the troubled pre-production and unsuccessful adaptation of Frank Herbert's novel Dune
 Empire of Dreams, about the complicated production of Star Wars

References

External links
 
 
 
 
 Burden of Dreams: In Dreams Begin Responsibilities an essay by Paul Arthur at the Criterion Collection
 The captions of Burden of Dreams (English only) at CSwap - Browsable and searchable (JavaScript required)

1982 films
Documentary films about films
Documentary films about film directors and producers
Films directed by Les Blank
Films shot in Amazonas (Brazilian state)
Films shot in Manaus
1982 documentary films
American documentary films
Werner Herzog
1980s English-language films
1980s American films